Right Cross is a 1950 American sports drama film released by MGM, directed by John Sturges, written by Charles Schnee and starring June Allyson, Ricardo Montalbán, Dick Powell, Lionel Barrymore and (in a small uncredited role) Marilyn Monroe.

Plot
Sean O'Malley, a wheelchair-using fight promoter once known as the best in his business, has lost his professional stature and is now in poor health. His daughter Pat has taken over many of his responsibilities and is romantically involved with his best fighter, Johnny Monterez.

Sean is unhappy that Johnny is ashamed of his Mexican heritage. When Sean tells Pat that promoter Allan Goff is trying to steal Johnny from him, Pat visits Johnny at his training camp in time to watch him fight a practice match, but Johnny hurts his hand.

While Johnny's hand is being examined at the hospital, Pat looks for her friend Rick Gavery, a hard-drinking sports reporter who has been following Johnny's career. Pat finds Rick in jail, where she has found him on many previous occasions. When Johnny's doctor tells him that his hand is now vulnerable to permanent injury, Johnny asks him to keep his condition a secret. After telling Pat and some reporters that his hand is merely bruised, Johnny returns to his training camp. A short time later, Johnny receives word that his trouble-prone cousin Luis is in jail again and needs bail money.

Believing that his injury may end his boxing career at any moment, Johnny agrees to sign a lucrative contract with Goff, who has promised Johnny guaranteed income from promotional sales after his retirement.

Johnny takes Rick to visit his mother, but soon after they arrive, Johnny tells his sister Marina that she must stop dating her boyfriend Bob because he is a "gringo" who is only interested in her because she is the sister of a famous fighter. When Rick accuses Johnny of harboring prejudice against whites, Johnny sends him away with an insult.

Later, Pat, expecting a marriage proposal from Johnny, is disappointed when Johnny tells her that he has decided to sign with Goff. Sean dies a short time later, and Pat accuses Johnny of killing her father with his act of betrayal. Realizing that he has nearly lost Pat's love and Rick's friendship, Johnny decides to leave boxing forever by purposely losing a title match. Pat and Johnny reconcile and look forward to a happy future together.

Cast
 June Allyson as Pat O'Malley
 Dick Powell as Rick Garvey
 Ricardo Montalbán as Johnny Monterez (credited as Ricardo Montalban)
 Lionel Barrymore as Sean O'Malley
 Teresa Celli as Marina Monterez
 Barry Kelley as Allan Goff
 Tom Powers as Tom Balford
 Mimi Aguglia as Mom Monterez
 Marianne Stewart as Audrey
 John Gallaudet as Phil Tripp
 Wally Maher as First Reporter
 Larry Keating as Second Reporter
 Kenneth Tobey as Ken, the Third Reporter
 Bert Davidson as Fourth Reporter
 Marilyn Monroe as Dusky Ledoux (uncredited)
 Robert Osterloh as Totem, Heldon's Manager (uncredited)

Music
The film's dramatic score was composed by David Raksin and conducted by Raksin and Johnny Green. Raksin's score consists only of music for the main and end titles, and one short piece in the first reel.

Raksin's music was issued on CD in 2009 by Film Score Monthly.

Reception
According to MGM records, the film cost $873,000 and earned $955,000 in the U.S. and Canada and $347,000 elsewhere, leading to a $64,000 loss for the studio.

In his review in Dennis Schwartz Movie Reviews, Dennis Schwartz rated it a "B-" calling it "a dull boxing melodrama".

References

External links 
 
 
 
 

1950 films
1950s sports drama films
American sports drama films
American black-and-white films
American boxing films
Films directed by John Sturges
Films scored by David Raksin
Metro-Goldwyn-Mayer films
1950 drama films
1950s English-language films
1950s American films